Caernarfon Town Football Club is a semi-professional Welsh football club based in Caernarfon, Gwynedd. The club is nicknamed "the Canaries" because of its yellow and green strip, a nickname that dates from 1895. Caernarfon Town plays at The Oval.

History

Predecessors
The first football club in Caernarfon, known as Caernarvon Wanderers, was formed in September 1876 and played at various grounds before moving to the Oval in 1888. On 30 October 1886, Wanderers were the first team from north west Wales to enter the FA Cup and lost 10–1 away to Stoke. Five years later, however, that particular club went out of existence but, in 1894, several former players began a new team called Carnarvon Ironopolis. That club competed in the North Wales Coast League, winning the championship on two occasions and reaching the semi-final of the Welsh Cup in 1900 and again in 1902. Unfortunately, following a dispute with the league, Ironopolis folded in 1903. The demise of the club resulted in some of the players forming the Caernarvon Celts while others affiliated to the Caernarvon RWF (Royal Welsh Fusiliers), both clubs playing at the Oval.

In 1906, the clubs amalgamated to form Carnarvon United and in 1909 the new club won both the Welsh and North Wales Amateur Cups. After the Great War, the demobbed United players formed a new club (Caernarvon Athletic) which, until 1921, played in the North Wales Coast League and thereafter the Welsh National League Division Two (West), with mixed fortune. In 1926, however, a limited company was formed and a full-time manager and professional team engaged. The club met with immediate success, winning the Welsh National League Division One championship in 1926–27, ahead of Bangor City and Rhyl, and repeating the feat in 1929–30 having been pipped to the title by Connah's Quay & Shotton 12 months earlier. Caernarvon Athletic are still remembered for their FA Cup run in 1929 when they defeated Darlington before going out to Bournemouth in a second round replay, the first game at the Oval attracting a crowd of some 9,000. In 1930, however, the club went into liquidation but two years later a re-formed team won the Welsh Combination before quitting over problems in using the Oval.

1937–1988
In 1937, a group of local soccer enthusiasts began Caernarfon Town F.C. and entered a team in the Welsh League North Division One. A 39-year unbroken membership of the league was begun and Caernarfon Town won the championship in 1946–47 and 1965–66 and finished runners-up in both 1956–57 and 1957–58 and once again in 1972–73. In 1976 internal problems led to the club's withdrawal from the league after just six matches but, within a matter of months, the club was once again re-formed and bounced back 12 months later. Astonishingly, the club then proceeded to win the league championship in each of the next two seasons!

After taking those two league titles in 1977–78 and 1978–79, losing only one game in total (Nantlle Vale winning 1–0 in 1977–78), Caernarfon were granted permission by the Welsh Football Association to join the Lancashire Combination league. The club went on to win the Combination Cup in 1981 (beating Bacup Borough in the two-legged final) and then the league championship in 1981–82, heading off the challenge of Colne Dynamoes by two points.

The following season, Caernarfon moved into the newly created North West Counties League and achieved promotion, along with Radcliffe Borough, at the first attempt. In 1985, Caernarfon Town were runners-up in the first division and were elected to the Northern Premier League. Despite a poor start, new manager John King turned playing affairs round and the club enjoyed its most successful FA Cup run in 1986–87. Caernarfon Town defeated Fourth Division Stockport County at the Oval and then defeated Third Division York City in a replay before losing a third round replay again to Second Division Barnsley by a goal to nil. The Canaries finished third in the NPL and felt that, if not for the FA Cup run, they would probably have gained promotion to the Football Conference. In May 1987, King left to become manager of Tranmere Rovers and former Liverpool wing-half Tommy Smith was appointed manager but left in December 1987 after a series of poor results, giving way to Phil Wilson who had been a player with the club the previous season.

A revival in the latter half of the 1987–88 campaign lifted Caernarfon up to third place and they also reached the semi-final of the Welsh Cup before losing out (on a 2–1 aggregate) to Cardiff City.

1989–2000
In 1989–90, Caernarfon were relegated to the NPL's first division and, following a series of mediocre performances over a five-year period, the club's board of directors decided to return to Welsh football. Thus, Caernarfon were welcomed into the League of Wales in August 1995. The 1995–96 season was very successful with Caernarfon achieving sixth place in the league table and reaching the semi-finals of both the League of Wales League Cup and the North Wales Coast F.A. Cup. That led to an even more enjoyable 1996–97 season when the Canaries challenged Barry Town for the league title before finishing fourth, just behind Ebbw Vale on goal difference and missing out on a place in Europe. The Canaries also progressed to the final of the North Wales Coast F.A. Cup before going down 2–1 to Porthmadog. Eifion Williams, the club's leading goalscorer, twice won international recognition for Wales at under-21 level and earned Caernarfon a reported £25,000 when transferred to champions Barry Town in 1997. 1997–98 proved to be a difficult campaign marked by the failure to replace Eifion Williams in attack. The club languished at the wrong end of the table for most of the season, before pulling clear of relegation.

Paul Rowlands became the Canaries' fourth manager that season and his contagious enthusiasm turned fortunes around. Twelve months later, Town just missed out on a place in Europe after ending in fifth place and reaching the final of the Gilbert League Cup, before losing to Barry Town. Nonetheless, the disasters of 1999–2000 were just around the corner. Town began the new term badly and an even worse financial plight saw the club part company with all its players. Dixie McNeill was appointed as manager in an attempt to avert the increasingly inevitable threat of relegation. The one bright spot was Caernarfon's 1–0 success over Swansea City in the FAW Premier Cup. The following season, however, was a marvellous time for the Canaries. The club won the Cymru Alliance championship and League Cup and also picked up the North Wales Coast Challenge Cup.

2001–2012
Manager Adrian Jones guided the team through this deserved success, and off the field a new stand and changing facilities were finally completed early in 2001. In 2001–02, the club enjoyed an encouraging League of Wales campaign but faded somewhat in the last third of the season and 2002–03 saw them achieve only 14th place. By early 2004, the Canaries were in contention for a top eight spot, but surprisingly decided to part company with manager Adie Jones after more than three years at the helm. Former Wrexham midfielder Wayne Phillips took the job in a caretaker role and continued on a permanent player/manager basis in 2004–05, but results did not really improve over his two seasons in charge and he stepped down in June 2007, to be replaced by former Oswestry Town and Cefn Druids manager Steve O'Shaughnessy. After occupying bottom place for much of the season, the Canaries finally improved their position at Easter and ended the season safe from the drop.

Steve O'Shaughnessey left Town at the end season 2007–08 to take over the hot seat at Connah's Quay Nomads and was replaced by David Rowe. Rowe found his first season in the Welsh Premier extremely difficult but improved results in the latter part of the season failed to rescue Caernarfon from the drop to the Cymru Alliance.

Rowe resigned due to work commitments in September 2009 and was succeeded by the management duo of Derek Roberts and Mel Jones, the first locally based management team for 20+ years. Bouncing back at the first time of asking was the aim for this season and striving to obtain the UEFA Domestic Licence but this aim was drastically re-evaluated after a disappointing run of results saw the club languish at the bottom end of the table. Derek and Mel parted company with the club in November 2009 and ex-Buckley Town manager Simon Sedgwick was appointed to the manager's role, along with assistant Paul Dodd.

In March 2009, with finances at an all-time low, and the club's entire future in doubt, the chairman, George Denham and fellow directors resigned. A group of current club officials and supporters took over the running of the club and put in place a plan to keep the Club in existence. A new management team of Geraint Williams and Ernie Talbot put together a locally based squad to see the club through the last games of the 2009–10 season.

The club were relegated to the Welsh Alliance for the start of the 2010–11 season and appointed Clive Jones as their new manager after the sudden resignation of Geraint Williams.

Following a poor run of results and with the club on the bottom of the Welsh Alliance League (Division 1), Clive Jones left the managerial post by mutual consent. Steve Smith was appointed manager in November 2010 with the task of keeping the Club in the Welsh Alliance Division 1 and developing a squad that could challenge for honours the following season. Steve was assisted by Colin Saynor, who stepped down from his role as Chairman of Llanberis, and head-coach Steven Bee. The trio steered the club to a respectable 5th place by the end of the season. After such a good run Caernarfon were fancied to win the league in 2011–12 but dropped points against teams in the lower half of the table consigned them to an eventual 4th spot. In January 2012, Steve Smith left the club by mutual consent and two months later former Llangefni Town boss Lee Dixon was appointed manager.

2013–present
On 13 April 2013, Caernarfon Town made their way to Latham Park, Newtown, to face Kilvey Fords FC of Swansea in the 2012–13 FAW Trophy Final. They won the match 6–0 and it was their first FAW Trophy since 1978. The victory against the Swansea Senior League outfit is the biggest final winning-margin in the competition's 123-year history. They also gained promotion to the Huws Gray Cymru Alliance during the 2012–13 by finishing top of the Welsh Alliance, taking 66 points from 28 games. On 24 September 2022 Caernarfon Town and The New Saints were invited to play in the Scottish SPFL Trust Cup, they would be drawn away to Clyde FC but were beaten 1–0 at New Douglas Park.

Rivalries
Caernarfon Town's main rivalries are with Porthmadog, Bangor City and Rhyl.

Current squad

References

External links
Official website

Football clubs in Wales
Sport in Gwynedd
Lancashire Combination
North West Counties Football League clubs
Northern Premier League clubs
1937 establishments in Wales
Caernarfon
Cymru Premier clubs
Cymru Alliance clubs
Association football clubs established in 1937
Welsh Alliance League clubs
Welsh League North clubs
Caernarfon Town F.C.